Political lesbianism is a phenomenon within feminism, primarily second-wave feminism and radical feminism; it includes, but is not limited to, lesbian separatism. Political lesbianism asserts that sexual orientation is a political and feminist choice, and advocates lesbianism as a positive alternative to heterosexuality for women as part of the struggle against sexism.

History
Political lesbianism originated in the late 1960s among second wave radical feminists as a way to fight sexism and compulsory heterosexuality. Sheila Jeffreys helped to develop the concept when she co-wrote in 1981 "Love Your Enemy? The Debate Between Heterosexual Feminism and Political Lesbianism"  with the Leeds Revolutionary Feminist Group. They argued that women should abandon support of heterosexuality and stop sleeping with men, while encouraging women to rid men "from your beds and your heads". While the main idea of political lesbianism is to be separate from men, this does not necessarily mean that political lesbians have to sleep with women; some choose to be celibate or identify as asexual. The Leeds Revolutionary Feminist Group definition of a political lesbian is "a woman identified woman who does not fuck men". They proclaimed men the enemy and women who were in relationships with them collaborators and complicit in their own oppression. Heterosexual behavior is seen as the basic unit of the patriarchy's political structure, lesbians who reject heterosexual behavior therefore disrupt the established political system.

Ti-Grace Atkinson, a radical feminist who helped to found the group The Feminists, is credited with the phrase that came to embody the movement: 'Feminism is the theory; lesbianism is the practice.'

Shared interest
New wave feminism  provided a platform for some women to come out of a perceived suffocating shell of heterosexual norms, traditional sexuality, marriage and family life, a life viewed by some feminists as one of hard labor with little consideration and a system that subordinates women. By coming out of dominating heterosexual relationships, women are given an opportunity to declare themselves as lesbians with shared interests. As a result, feminism would be able to provide an environment in which lesbianism was less about personal pain or anguish but an important political issue.

In a broad sense, political lesbianism entails the political identification of women with women, it encompasses a role beyond sexuality but supports eschewing forming relationships with men. It is partly based on the idea that women sharing and promoting a common interest creates a positive and needed energy which is necessary to enhance and elevate the role of women in the society, a development which will be curtailed by the institutions of heterosexuality and sexism if women choose the traditional norms.

Though there was some discrimination against lesbians within the feminist movement, it ended up providing a needed political platform for them.  In its wake, it also expanded and introduced divergent views of sexuality.

Lesbian separatism
Separatist feminism is a form of radical feminism that holds that opposition to patriarchy is best done through focusing exclusively on women and girls.  Some separatist feminists do not believe that men can make positive contributions to the feminist movement and that even well-intentioned men replicate the dynamics of patriarchy.

Charlotte Bunch, an early member of The Furies Collective, viewed separatist feminism as a strategy, a "first step" period, or temporary withdrawal from mainstream activism to accomplish specific goals or enhance personal growth. The Furies recommended that Lesbian Separatists relate "only (with) women who cut their ties to male privilege" and suggest that "as long as women still benefit from heterosexuality, receive its privileges and security, they will at some point have to betray their sisters, especially Lesbian sisters who do not receive those benefits".

Social constructs of sexuality and criticism
Some feminist theory on sexuality evaded biological fixation and embraced social construction as the basis of sexuality. However, this idea posed further questions on the subject of sexuality and lesbianism, and the long term sustainability of a purely lesbian society without men or children. If sexuality could be a construction of human nature then little room is given to understanding the nature of the historical formation of human nature, especially, if the historical nature of man or woman enhanced heterosexuality.  A lack of theoretical clarity of lesbianism and sexuality becomes more profound as sexuality is viewed as much more than choice. Also, if lesbianism becomes a social institution, the avenue for a dominant persona in the relationships may also pose challenge to the original intention of political lesbianism.

See also

 Lesbian erasure
 Lesbian feminism
 Lesbophobia
 Fourth-wave feminism
 Radical lesbians
 Separatist feminism
 Womyn's land

Proponents

 Adrienne Rich
 Gloria E. Anzaldúa
 Julie Bindel
 Yvonne Rainer

References

Further reading

 
 
 
 
 
 
 
  (Originally published in Signs: Journal of Women in Culture and Society, Summer 1980, 5, no. 4, pp. 631–660.)
 
 

 
Feminism and history
Lesbian feminism
Lesbianism
LGBT terminology
Radical feminism
LGBT and society
1960s neologisms